is a collection of writings used in the Rinzai school of Zen. Initially it was a compilation of Zen writings by Tōyō Eichō (東陽榮朝, 1428–1504) a disciple of Kanzan Egen of the Myōshin-ji line of Rinzai school in Kyoto, Japan. Tōyō's anthology consisted of 5,000 writings compiled from writings of various traditions, such as Confucianism, Taoism and Zen, and the poetry of Tang and Song China.

The original sources include the Blue Cliff Record, The Gateless Gate, the Sutras, The Analects, The Great Learning, The Doctrine of the Mean, writings by Mencius, Laozi and Zhuang Zhou, and the poetry of Hanshan, Tao Yuanming, Du Fu, Li Bai, and Bai Juyi, among others. Tōyō arranged the writings in order of length, from single- to eight-character expressions, interspersing parallel verses of five through eight characters.

This was known as the Ku Zōshi (The Phrase Book), and circulated in manuscript form until the 17th century, when Ijūshi published for the first time in 1688 an expanded version of the book, titled Zenrin-kushū. It is known that at least since the time of Hakuin Ekaku (1685-1788) the Zenrin-kushū has been used as part of the kōan practice, as the jakugo or capping verses — responses by students to problems given to them by their teachers.

See also
Zen
Kōan
Jakugo
Classical Chinese poetry

References

Bibliography

External links
 Shigematsu, Sōiku.  (1981)
 Hori, Victor Sōgen.  (2010), pp. 3–98

Philosophy books
Rinzai school
Zen texts
1688 books
17th century in Japan
Spiritual practice